Brian Olsen (born 1975) is an American former mixed martial artist. A professional from 2004 until 2008, he was the last WEC Heavyweight Champion before it was abolished when Zuffa purchased the organization.

Mixed martial arts career

World Extreme Cagefighting
Olsen made his debut against Craig Zellner on March 17, 2005 at WEC 14: Vengeance. He defeated Zellner via TKO in the second round.

Olsen fought for the vacant WEC heavyweight title against Lavar Johnson on January 13, 2006 at WEC 18: Unfinished Business. He defeated Johnson via submission due to a knee injury and became the new heavyweight champion.

Olsen made a title defense against Mike Kyle on May 5, 2006 at WEC 20: Cinco de Mayhem. Kyle was disqualified after hitting Olsen with illegal strikes, for which he was placed on the national suspension list by CSAC.

Olsen remained as the last WEC heavyweight champion, because Zuffa abolished the heavyweight division from WEC after it was purchased.

Post-WEC
Olsen fought twice for Canadian's promotion Ultimate Generation Combat. He defeated J.R. Alexander and Mike Marshalleck, both via TKO in the first round.

Olsen faced Fernando Rivera on May 9, 2008 at USFL: War in the Woods 3. He won via TKO early in the first round.

Championships and accomplishments
World Extreme Cagefighting
WEC Heavyweight Championship (One time; last)
One title defense

Mixed martial arts record

|-
| Win
| align=center| 9–1
| Fernando Rivera
| TKO (punches)
| USFL: War in the Woods 3
| 
| align=center| 1
| align=center| 1:41
| Ledyard, Connecticut, United States
| 
|-
| Win
| align=center| 8–1
| Mike Marshalleck
| TKO (strikes)
| Ultimate Generation Combat 17
| 
| align=center| 1
| align=center| 1:26
| Montreal, Quebec, Canada
| 
|-
| Win
| align=center| 7–1
| J.R. Alexander
| TKO (strikes)
| Ultimate Generation Combat 16
| 
| align=center| 1
| align=center| 0:08
| Montreal, Quebec, Canada
| 
|-
| Win
| align=center| 6–1
| Mike Kyle
| DQ (strikes after the bell)
| WEC 20: Cinco de Mayhem
| 
| align=center| 1
| align=center| 5:00
| Lemoore, California, United States
| 
|-
| Win
| align=center| 5–1
| Lavar Johnson
| TKO (knee injury)
| WEC 18: Unfinished Business
| 
| align=center| 2
| align=center| 0:14
| Lemoore, California, United States
| 
|-
| Loss
| align=center| 4–1
| Ibragim Magomedov
| KO (punch)
| Euphoria: USA vs. Russia
| 
| align=center| 1
| align=center| 3:32
| Atlantic City, New Jersey, United States
| 
|-
| Win
| align=center| 4–0
| Glenn Sandull
| TKO (punches)
| Reality Fighting 8
| 
| align=center| 1
| align=center| N/A
| Atlantic City, New Jersey, United States
|Won the vacant Reality Fighting Heavyweight Championship.
|-
| Win
| align=center| 3–0
| Craig Zellner
| TKO (punches)
| WEC 14: Vengeance
| 
| align=center| 1
| align=center| 2:14
| Lemoore, California, United States
| 
|-
| Win
| align=center| 2–0
| Tyler Oleksak
| TKO (punches)
| Mass Destruction 18
| 
| align=center| 1
| align=center| N/A
| Boston, Massachusetts, United States
| 
|-
| Win
| align=center| 1–0
| Jed Tinlin
| Decision (split)
| ECFA: Halloween Throwdown
| 
| align=center| N/A
| align=center| N/A
| Taunton, Massachusetts, United States
|

References

External links

1975 births
Living people
American male mixed martial artists
People from Enfield, Connecticut
Mixed martial artists from Connecticut